Mútne is a large village and municipality in Námestovo District in the Žilina Region of northern Slovakia.

History
In historical records the village was first mentioned in 1659.

Geography
The municipality lies at an altitude of 836 metres and covers an area of 64.452 km². It has a population of about 2835 people.

References

External links
Municipal website
 Goral dialect from linguistic point of view – covering Mutne (in Slovak)

Villages and municipalities in Námestovo District